Plant Bowen, commonly known as Bowen Steam Plant, is a coal-fired power station located just outside Euharlee, Georgia, United States, approximately  west-south-west from Cartersville. At over 3,450 megawatts, Plant Bowen is one of the largest coal-fired power plants in North America. The station is connected to the southeastern power grid by numerous 500 kV transmission lines, and is owned and operated by Georgia Power, a subsidiary of Southern Company.

Description
Plant Bowen consists of four units, with capacities of 806, 789, 952, and 952 megawatts, respectively. The first unit began operation in 1971, and additional units were brought online in 1972, 1974, and 1975, respectively. 

Particulates are removed from the exhaust gases through the use of electrostatic precipitators. The exhaust gases are then closely monitored to comply with air quality regulations. In addition, Jet Bubble Reactor (JBR) units have recently been constructed on all four units to meet federal clean air and ozone standards. Coal for this plant comes from Eastern Kentucky and is delivered by CSX Transportation Inc. Atlanta Division crews with unit coal trains that are sometimes 120 cars long.

Incidents
On 4 April 2013, an explosion occurred on unit 2 while it was being removed from service and readied for a planned maintenance outage.  This caused significant damage to the plant but there were no serious injuries.  The explosion was attributed to a mixture of hydrogen and air in the generator, due to failure to comply with procedures.

On July 13, 2017, a transformer in the plant's switchyard caught fire. A thick, black cloud of smoke was formed, but no one was injured.

See also

 List of coal power stations
 List of largest power stations in the world
 List of power stations in the United States

References

External links

 Georgia Power: Plant Bowen
 Plant Diagram
 Data on generation and fuel consumption from the Energy Information Administration Electricity Data Browser

Towers in Georgia (U.S. state)
Coal-fired power stations in Georgia (U.S. state)
Buildings and structures in Bartow County, Georgia
Chimneys in the United States
Georgia Power
Energy infrastructure completed in 1975
Towers completed in 1975
Industrial fires and explosions in the United States